Viktor Potočki (born 27 March 1999) is a Croatian professional road racing cyclist, who currently rides for UCI Continental team . 

In 2018, Potočki won the Croatian National Road Race Championships.

Major results

2016
 National Junior Road Championships
1st  Road race
3rd Time trial
 7th Overall Belgrade Trophy Milan Panić
2017
 National Junior Road Championships
1st  Road race
1st  Time trial
 5th Overall Belgrade Trophy Milan Panić
2018
 1st  Road Race, National Road Championships
 3rd Time trial, National Under–23 Road Championships
 6th Overall Tour de Serbie
1st  Young rider classification
2019
 1st  Time trial, National Under–23 Road Championships
 3rd Road Race, National Road Championships
 6th GP Sencur
 8th GP Kranj
2020
 National Track Championships
1st  Kilo
1st  Individual Pursuit
 1st  Time trial, National Under–23 Road Championships
 1st  National Cyclo–cross Championships
 2nd Road Race, National Road Championships
2021
 1st  Road Race, National Road Championships
 2nd Giro del Belvedere
2022
 National Road Championships
2nd Time trial
5th Road race
 3rd Poreč Trophy
 4th Overall Tour de Serbie
1st  Points classification
1st Stage 2
 4th GP Adria Mobil
 6th GP Poland, Visegrad 4 Bicycle Race
 7th GP Slovenian Istria
 8th GP Kranj

References

External links

1999 births
Living people
Croatian male cyclists
Cyclists at the 2019 European Games